Musa Najafi (born 1962 in Isfahan) is an Iranian professor, historian and author. He is the director of the Department of Political Thought and Philosophy at Islamic Azad University and directs the PhD group in political science at Imam Khomeini Educational Research Institute, with a focus on issues in Iran. Najafi also heads the Research Institute of Culture and Islamic Civilization and Revolution, where he is head of the Department of Islamic Revolution Theory. Najafi is a former faculty member of the Department of the Political science at Tehran University.

He presented and debated with a committee a theory of the evolution and the formation of the national identity of Iran, considering the period from pre-Islamic times until today. Najafi won an Iranian Book of the Year Award for Levels of Political Philosophy in Islamic Civilization, which was recognized by Iran's Secretariat of Islamic Scholars in 2003.

Education
Najafi holds a bachelor's and master's degree in political science from Tehran University and a PhD in political science from Iran's Institute for Humanities and Cultural Studies. His PhD thesis was titled "Levels of Political Philosophy in the Context of the Rise of Islamic Culture and Civilization", advised by Reza Davari Ardakani.

Bibliography
 Ta ammulat-i siyasi dar tarikh-i tafakkur-i Islami
 Andishah-`i siyasi va tarikh-i nahzat-i Hajj-i Aqa
 Muqaddimah-i tahilili-i tarikh-i tahavvulat-i siyasi-i
 Andishah-i dini va sikularism
 Ta`mulat-i siyasi dar tarikh-i tafakkur-i Islami
 Mutun mabani va takvin: andishah- i tahrim dar tarikh-i
 Mutun, mabani, takvin: Andishah-i tahrim dar tarikh-i siyasi-i Iran : tahqiq piramun-i mutun, fatavi, madarik-i tarikhi-i andishah-i tahrim ya muqavamat-i manfi dar yak qarn tarikh-i siyasi-i Iran
 Andishah-i siyasi va tarikh-i nihzat-i bidargaranah-i Nur Allah Isfahani
 Hawzah-i Najaf va falsafah-i tajaddud dar Iran (Gharbshinasi)
 Tarikh-i tahavvulat-i siyasi-i Iran
 Ta°amul-i diyanat va siyasat dar Iran (Gharbshinasi, gharbgirayi va gharbsitizi-i Iraniyan)
 Andishah-i siyasi va tarikh-i nahzat-i Hajj Nur Allah Isfahani (Zu°ama-yi mashrutiyat)
 Maratib-i Zuhur-i falsafah-i siyasat dar tamaddun-i Islami
 Muqaddimah-i tahlili-i tarikh-i tahavvulat-i siyasi-i Iran: Din, dawlat, tajaddud : takvin-i huviyat-i milli-i nuvin-i Iran az °asr-i Safaviyah ta dawran-i mu°asir
 Andishah-i dini va sikularism dar hawzah-i ma°rifat-i siyasi va gharbshinasi: Dahahha-yi nukhustin yaksad sal-i akhir-i Iran

References

1962 births
Living people
20th-century Iranian historians
Writers from Isfahan
Academic staff of the University of Tehran
University of Tehran alumni
Academic staff of the Islamic Azad University
Academic staff of the Institute for Humanities and Cultural Studies
Institute for Humanities and Cultural Studies alumni